Christie Front Drive is the only studio album by the indie rock band Christie Front Drive. It was released in 1996 on Caulfield Records, and re-released as a remastered edition with DVD on Magic Bullet Records. Bonus DVD contains the band's final performance in 1996. "Radio" appeared on a best-of emo songs list by Vulture.

Track listing

"Saturday" – 6:35
"Radio" – 3:49
Untitled – 0:42
"November" – 3:56
Untitled – 1:06
"Fin" – 4:30
"About Two Days" – 6:08
Untitled – 1:27
"Seven Day Candle" – 3:46
Untitled – 0:39

Personnel
Eric Richter – vocals, guitar
Jason Begin – guitar
Kerry McDonald – bass
Ron Marschall – drums

References

1997 albums
Christie Front Drive albums